Barton Coliseum is a 7,150-seat multi-purpose arena located within the Arkansas State Fairgrounds in Little Rock, Arkansas. The coliseum was dedicated on September 29, 1952, in honor of Thomas Harry Barton, founder of Lion Oil.

It is the former home of the Arkansas–Little Rock Trojans basketball team, the defunct Arkansas GlacierCats of the WPHL (now defunct) and the defunct Arkansas Impact of the PBL.

The Trojans moved into Alltel Arena, when it opened in 1999 and remained there, until the team moved into Jack Stephens Center in 2005. Prior to the Trojans' move to the Sun Belt Conference, the venue hosted five Trans America Athletic Conference (TAAC) men's basketball tournaments in 1983, 1986, 1987, 1989 and 1990. It has since hosted three Sun Belt Conference men's basketball tournaments.

During the annual Arkansas State Fair, the coliseum is the venue for the fair's rodeo events. Additionally, it is used as the location throughout the year for spectator events featuring monster trucks, motorcycle acrobatics, and other shows.

Countless rock concerts were held here until the completion of Alltel Arena. This fan-friendly site sold general admission tickets so that hardcore fans arriving hours before the doors opened could just about guarantee themselves a spot on the barrier. The entire floor of the coliseum was standing room only. Tailgating in the parking lot before the shows made these rock concerts all day parties.

On April 17, 1972, Elvis Presley played Barton Coliseum to 10,000 fans and a complete sell out. Elvis wore the “Burning Love” suit. Elvis's suits were not named by him, but mostly posthumously by his legions of fans.

On December 2, 1972, it played host to the Jackson 5 concert.

In 1978, Blue Öyster Cult made a live recording of "(Don't Fear) The Reaper", which was later used on their live album, Some Enchanted Evening.

On October 29, 2012, Rob Zombie along with Marilyn Manson played at Barton Coliseum in support of their Twins of Evil 2012 tour.

The Arkansas High School State Finals were held here in 2013.

See also 

Jack Stephens Center
War Memorial Stadium

References

External links
 Arkansas State Fair History at The Encyclopedia of Arkansas History & Culture - EncyclopediaOfArkansas.net
 Contact info and map at Little Rock Convention & Visitors Bureau - LittleRock.com
 Contacts and details at Arkansas Department of Parks & Tourism - Arkansas.com
 Official Website at Arkansas State Fair - ArkansasStateFair.com

Little Rock Trojans men's basketball
College basketball venues in the United States
Indoor ice hockey venues in the United States
Sports in Little Rock, Arkansas
Basketball venues in Arkansas
Indoor arenas in Arkansas
1952 establishments in Arkansas
Sports venues completed in 1952